Kran is a village in Kirkovo Municipality, Kardzhali Province, southern Bulgaria.

References

Villages in Kardzhali Province